Andreas Søndergaard (born 17 January 2001) is a Danish professional footballer who plays as a goalkeeper for EFL Championship club Swansea City.

Career

Søndergaard started his career with English Premier League side Wolves after receiving interest from Milan in the Italian Serie A. In 2021, he was sent on loan to Danish top flight club Randers. On 27 October 2021, Søndergaard debuted for Randers during a 4–0 win over Middelfart. Before the second half of 2021–22, Søndergaard was sent on loan to Hereford in the English sixth tier.

On 31 January 2023, Søndergaard left Wolves by mutual concent. 

On 17 February 2023, Søndergaard joined Swansea City on a short-term deal.

References

External links
  

2001 births
Living people
Danish men's footballers
Denmark youth international footballers
Wolverhampton Wanderers F.C. players
Hereford F.C. players
Randers FC players
Swansea City A.F.C. players
National League (English football) players
Association football goalkeepers
Danish expatriate men's footballers
Danish expatriate sportspeople in England
Expatriate footballers in England
Danish expatriate sportspeople in Wales
Expatriate footballers in Wales